OXEP is an extended play by the American metalcore band Coalesce. The EP was released on November 10, 2009 through Relapse Records. The album was planned and written prior to the release of OXEP'''s companion album, Ox''.

Track listing

Personnel
 Sean Ingram – vocals
 Jes Steineger – guitar
 Nathan Ellis – bass
 Nathan "Jr." Richardson – drums

References

External links
Coalesce official website

Coalesce (band) albums
2009 EPs
Relapse Records EPs